Vikas is a given name (see article for a list of people with the name).

Vikas may also refer to:

Education 
 Grama Vikas Kendra, extension centre of the Mahatma Gandhi University
 Netraheen Vikas Sansthan, residential school for the blind in Jodhpur, Rajasthan, India
 Rajkiya Pratibha Vikas Vidyalaya, system of schools in Delhi, India
 Vidhyaa Vikas Educational Institutions, group of educational institutions located in Tiruchengode, Tamil Nadu
 Vidya Vikas Institute of Engineering & Technology (VVIET), Engineering college in Mysore
 Vikas Pre-University College, Mangalore
 Vikas Vidyalaya, boarding school in Kolkata, India

Political 
 Bahujan Vikas Aaghadi, political party in Maharashtra
 Bharat Vikas Morcha, political party in Bihar
 Bharatiya Manavata Vikas Party, political party in India
 Bihar Vikas Party, political party in Bihar
 Chhattisgarh Vikas Party, former political party
 Haryana Vikas Party, former political party in Haryana
 Himachal Vikas Congress, former political party in Himachal Pradesh
 Jharkhand Vikas Morcha (Prajatantrik), political party in India
 Karnataka Vikas Party, a political party in Karnataka
 Kisan Vikas Party, political party in Bihar
 Maharashtra Vikas Party, political party in Maharashtra 
 Manu Bhandari v. Kala Vikas Motion Pictures Ltd, landmark case in the area of Indian copyright law
 Purvanchal Vikas Party, political party founded ahead of the 2004 Lok Sabha election in the India
 Rajasthan Vikas Party, a political party in Rajasthan
 Sampurna Vikas Dal, political party in Bihar
 Shahar Vikas Aghadi, several local political parties in Greater India
 Vidarbha Vikas Party, political party in Maharashtra

Others 
 Andhra Pradesh Grameena Vikas Bank, regional rural bank
 Gram Vikas, NGO in Odisha
 Gujarat Urja Vikas Nigam, electrical services umbrella company in the state of Gujarat
 Kisan Vikas Patra, saving certificate scheme
 Mumbai Railway Vikas Corporation, subsidiary of the Indian Railways
 Rail Vikas Nigam Limited, builder of engineering works required by Indian Railways
 Rajiv Gandhi Mahila Vikas Pariyojana, NGO for women
 Rashtriya Krishi Vikas Yojana, State Plan Scheme for agriculture in India
 Sabka Saath, Sabka Vikas, Government of India policy for inclusive development
 Vikas Nagar, village in the Nicobar district of Andaman and Nicobar Islands
 Vikas Publishing House, publishing firm based in New Delhi
 Vikas (rocket engine), a liquid-fueled rocket engine made by India

See also 
 Vika (disambiguation)